Amber Marshall (born 19 July 2001) is a professional Australian tennis player.

Marshall has a career-high WTA singles ranking of 773, achieved on 20 January 2020. She also has a career-high WTA doubles ranking of 465, achieved on 18 November 2019. Marshall has won one ITF doubles title.

She made her Grand Slam main-draw debut after winning the 2020 Australian Open Women's Doubles Wildcard Playoff, granting her a wild card into the 2020 Australian Open women's doubles event alongside Alexandra Bozovic.

ITF finals

Doubles (1–1)

External links
 
 
 

2001 births
Living people
Australian female tennis players
Tennis players from Adelaide
21st-century Australian women